Nathan Warren Harter (November 15, 1884 – January 9, 1952) was an American football coach and mathematics professor. He served as the head football coach at Thiel College in Greenville, Pennsylvania from 1911 to 1912, compiling a record of 3–5–1.

Harter was a 1909 graduate of Wittenberg College.

Head coaching record

References

External links
 

1884 births
1952 deaths
Thiel Tomcats football coaches
Wittenberg University alumni
People from Medina, Ohio